Clive James Charles Betts (born 13 January 1950) is a British Labour Party politician and former economist. He has served as the Member of Parliament (MP) for Sheffield South East since 2010 having previously represented the constituency of Sheffield Attercliffe from 1992 to 2010.

Early life 
Betts was born on 13 January 1950 in Sheffield. He was state educated at the Longley School in Sheffield, King Edward VII School, Sheffield and Pembroke College, Cambridge, where he received a BA in Economics and Politics.

He joined the Labour Party in 1969 and joined the Trades Union Congress in 1971 as an economist. In 1973, he was appointed as an economist with Derbyshire County Council, and moved to the South Yorkshire County Council in 1974 where he was an economist until 1986. In 1986, he was appointed as an economist with Rotherham Borough Council.

Sheffield City Council
Betts stood unsuccessfully as the Labour Party candidate in the Burngreave Ward in the 1975 city council election. He was subsequently elected in the Firth Park ward in the 1976 city council election and re-elected in 1980, 1984 and 1988.

As a Sheffield City councillor, he was chair of the Housing Committee for six years, deputy leader and chair of the Finance Committee for one year and the chief whip of the Labour Group for three years. He was also formerly the group secretary.

Betts became deputy leader of Sheffield City Council under David Blunkett in 1986. He succeeded Blunkett as leader in 1987 following the latter's election as MP for Sheffield Brightside. As leader of the council, Betts presided over the council's controversial decision to fund the 1991 World Student Games.

Parliamentary career 
In October 1974, he unsuccessfully stood for election to the House of Commons as the Labour Party candidate in the safe Conservative seat of Sheffield Hallam, being defeated by the incumbent John Osborn. At the subsequent general election, he unsuccessfully fought the safe Conservative seat of Louth, being defeated by the incumbent Michael Brotherton.

He was selected to contest the safe Labour seat of Sheffield Attercliffe following the retirement of the veteran Labour MP Patrick Duffy. At the 1992 general election, Betts was elected with a large majority, and made his maiden speech on 6 May 1992, the day of the Queen's Speech, being the first new member to do so.

Government career
Betts was made an opposition whip under Tony Blair in 1996, and after the 1997 general election, he entered the government as an assistant whip. He was promoted in 1998 to full whip, with the title of Lord Commissioner to the Treasury, but was dropped from the government after the 2001 general election.

Select committee membership
Since 10 June 2010, he has been chairman of the Communities and Local Government Committee and, on 19 June 2015, was returned unopposed as its chairman.

Elsewhere, Betts sits on the Finance Committee, Panel of Chairs, National Policy Statements Sub-Committee and Liaison Committee. He has been on the Treasury and Civil Service Committee, Treasury Committee, Committee of Selection, Transport, Local Government and The Regions Committee, Urban Affairs Sub-Committee, Yorkshire and the Humber Regional Select Committee, Committee on Reform of the House of Commons, Liaison Committee and Office of the Deputy Prime Minister Select committee.

Suspension
In 2003, Betts was suspended from the House of Commons for seven days for irregularities involving the employment and visa of Jose Gasparo, a Brazilian student with previous experience as a male escort. The Daily Telegraph newspaper reported on 10 July 2010 that Betts' partner and parliamentary assistant, James Thomas, had tried to edit this fact from Betts' English Wikipedia page in an attempt to cover it up.

Betts was found guilty of breaching the MPs' code of conduct, with the Standards and Privileges Committee stating that he had acted "extremely foolishly" and had risked damaging public confidence in the integrity of Parliament. Particular concerns involved his failure to disclose Gasparo's background to parliamentary authorities and the fact that Betts had knowingly photocopied an altered document on Gasparo's behalf. Betts gave an "unreserved apology" in a personal statement to MPs when the report was published.

Expenses
In 2003, Betts was subject to criticism for his accommodation expenses after he had previously campaigned for an increase in MPs' entitlements on the ground of "hardship". It was reported by The Times that Betts had "flipped" his designated second home to Yorkshire before buying a "country estate" there, before "flipping it" back to London and taking out a larger mortgage on his flat there. Betts denied wrongdoing, arguing the Yorkshire property had been "two dilapidated listed buildings" and that when he became a whip he had to declare his main residence as his London flat.

In 2004, he was criticised by the British Medical Association for going to Portugal with 15 fellow MPs on an all-expenses trip paid for by the fast food chain McDonald's. Betts responded that if MPs had a "puritanical" attitude about food then people would ignore what they said.
He faced further criticism in 2010 after it was reported that he was one of eight MPs who were renting out a "second home" in London while claiming for the cost of renting a '"third home" in the city at taxpayers' expense. Although legal, critics argued the "loophole" was allowing MPs to increase their income after the rules on parliamentary expenses were tightened.

Betts employs his partner as his Senior Parliamentary Assistant on a salary up to £45,000. He was listed in articles in The Daily Telegraph and The Guardian which criticised the practice of MPs employing family members, on the lines that it promotes nepotism. Although MPs who were first elected in 2017 have been banned from employing family members, the restriction is not retrospective – meaning that Betts' employment of his partner is lawful.

Policies and views
Betts backed remain in the 2016 United Kingdom European Union membership referendum. He supported Owen Smith in the 2016 Labour leadership election.

Personal life 
Betts lives in a farmhouse on the Derbyshire border with his partner James Thomas, who is also employed as his parliamentary assistant. He plays cricket, supports Sheffield Wednesday F.C. and, in the past, has played squash and football and used to be a regular Sheffield Marathon runner. In March 2021, Betts became a trustee of the green space charity Fields in Trust.

Notes

References

External links 
 Clive Betts MP official web site

 Papers of Clive Betts, MP, Sheffield (reference MP8) held at Sheffield City Archives CalmView: Record

1950 births
Living people
Alumni of Pembroke College, Cambridge
Councillors in Sheffield
Gay politicians
Labour Party (UK) MPs for English constituencies
LGBT members of the Parliament of the United Kingdom
People educated at King Edward VII School, Sheffield
Politics of Sheffield
Transport and General Workers' Union-sponsored MPs
UK MPs 1992–1997
UK MPs 1997–2001
UK MPs 2001–2005
UK MPs 2005–2010
UK MPs 2010–2015
UK MPs 2015–2017
English LGBT politicians
UK MPs 2017–2019
UK MPs 2019–present
Leaders of local authorities of England
21st-century LGBT people